Jermaine "Jonte" Flowers (born April 12, 1985) is an American professional basketball player.

Career
Flowers signed with the Romanian team CSU Asesoft Ploiești for the 2013–14 season. After 6 games, 4 in the Romanian league and 2 in the EuroCup, Flowers tore his achilles tendon. In July 2014, he extended his contract with Asesoft for one more season. In July 2015, he signed with Italian team Fortitudo Bologna.

Honours
 Joensuun Kataja
 Korisliiga Bronze medal (1): 2012–13

Statistics

|-
| 2012–13
| style="text-align:left;"|  Joensuun Kataja
|  style="text-align:center;"| Korisliiga
| 45 ||  || 30.8 || .538 || .385 ||  .772 || 6.1 || 2.4 || 2.5 || 0.6 || 16.8
|-
|}

Personal life
Flowers is married to Jennifer Flowers, a former athlete at Winona State and current vice-president and women's commissioner of the Western Collegiate Hockey Association.

References

External links
Jonte Flowers at eurobasket.com
Jonte Flowers at fiba.com
Jonte Flowers at nbadraft.net

1985 births
Living people
American expatriate basketball people in Denmark
American expatriate basketball people in Germany
American expatriate basketball people in Israel
American expatriate basketball people in Lithuania
American expatriate basketball people in Romania
American expatriate basketball people in the Netherlands
Basketball players from Chicago
BC Juventus players
HTV Basket players
JA Vichy players
Small forwards
Winona State Warriors men's basketball players
American men's basketball players